The 17 June 2008 Baghdad bombing was a suicide car bomb attack on a bus stop in northern Baghdad, the capital city of Iraq, on 17 June 2008, killing 51 people and wounding 75.

The attack happened in the Shia neighbourhood of Hurriya. The explosion struck during the early evening rush hour, when the bus stop was crowded with waiting passengers.

References

2008 murders in Iraq
Mass murder in 2008
Al-Qaeda activities in Iraq
Suicide car and truck bombings in Iraq
Suicide bombings in Baghdad
Terrorist incidents in Iraq in 2008
Terrorist incidents in Baghdad
2000s in Baghdad
Violence against Shia Muslims in Iraq
June 2008 events in Iraq